Lester S. and Missouri "Zue" Gordon Parker House is a historic home located at Jefferson City, Cole County, Missouri. It was built in 1905, and is a two-story, irregular plan, a Classical Revival style brick dwelling with a hipped roof.  It has two two-story brick pavilions and features a full height central portico with classical pediment and Ionic order columns and pilasters.  Also on the property are the contributing small two-story brick dwelling and root cellar.

It was listed on the National Register of Historic Places in 2000, and it is located in the Capitol Avenue Historic District.

References

Individually listed contributing properties to historic districts on the National Register in Missouri
Houses on the National Register of Historic Places in Missouri
Neoclassical architecture in Missouri
Houses completed in 1905
Buildings and structures in Jefferson City, Missouri
National Register of Historic Places in Cole County, Missouri
1905 establishments in Missouri